Walter Harrison PC (2 January 1921 – 19 October 2012) was a British Labour politician that served as Member of Parliament of Wakefield from October 1964 to May 1987.

Biography
Harrison was educated at Dewsbury Technical College and School of Art. He was a foreman electrician and was active in the Electrical Trades Union. He served as a councillor on West Riding County Council and as an alderman of Castleford Borough Council.

Elected Labour MP for Wakefield in 1964, Harrison served as a Government whip from 1966 to 1970 and as deputy Chief Whip from 1974 to 1979. On one occasion in 1968, Harrison was whipping on two bills simultaneously, trapping his leg in the door of a division lobby on the second vote; famously ruling that most of Harrison's body was in the lobby, the chairman of the bill committee declared the vote passed 22¾–22 in Labour's favour. In the Conservative landslide at the 1983 general election, he held his seat - which had undergone substantial boundary changes - with a majority of only 360 votes over the Conservative candidate.

Harrison retired from parliament in 1987.  He died on 19 October 2012, aged 91.

Role in 1979 vote of no confidence

On 28 March 1979, Harrison played a critical role in the defeat of the Labour government in the vote of confidence. As the vote loomed, Harrison approached Conservative MP Bernard Weatherill to enforce the convention and "gentlemen's agreement" that if a sick MP from the Government could not vote, an MP from the Opposition would abstain to compensate. The Labour MP Sir Alfred Broughton was on his deathbed and could not vote, meaning the Government would probably lose by one vote.

Weatherill said that the convention had never been intended for Matter of Confidence and it would be impossible to find a Conservative MP who would agree to abstain. However, after a moment's reflection, he offered that he himself would abstain, because he felt it would be dishonourable to break his word with Harrison. Harrison was so impressed by Weatherill's offer – which would have effectively ended his political career – that he released Weatherill from his obligation and so the Government fell by one vote on the agreement of gentlemen.

This episode was dramatised in James Graham's 2012 play This House (which opened one month before Harrison's death). When the play was first performed at the National Theatre, the part of Harrison was played by Philip Glenister.

References

Sources
Times Guide to the House of Commons, 1966 & 1983

External links 
 

1921 births
2012 deaths
Members of West Riding County Council
Electrical, Electronic, Telecommunications and Plumbing Union-sponsored MPs
Electrical Trades Union (United Kingdom)-sponsored MPs
Labour Party (UK) MPs for English constituencies
Members of the Privy Council of the United Kingdom
UK MPs 1964–1966
UK MPs 1966–1970
UK MPs 1970–1974
UK MPs 1974
UK MPs 1974–1979
UK MPs 1979–1983
UK MPs 1983–1987
Treasurers of the Household
Politics of Wakefield
Ministers in the Wilson governments, 1964–1970